The 2011–12 season is Levski Sofia's 90th season in the First League. This article shows player statistics and all matches (official and friendly) that the club has played during the 2011–12 season.

Transfers

Summer transfers

In: 

Out:

See List of Bulgarian football transfers summer 2011

Winter transfers

In: 

Out:

See List of Bulgarian football transfers winter 2011–12

Squad
As of July 6, 2011

Statistics

Goalscorers

Assists

Cards

Pre-season and friendlies

Summer

Winter

Competitions

A Group

Table

Results summary

Results by round

Fixtures and results

Bulgarian Cup

Second round

Levski advanced to Third Round.

Third round

Levski advanced to Quarterfinals

Quarterfinal

Levski is eliminated from the competition.

Europa League

Third qualifying round 

Levski is eliminated from the competition.

References

PFC Levski Sofia seasons
Levski Sofia
Levski Sofia